Steve McCurry (born April 23, 1950) is an American photographer, freelancer, and photojournalist. His photo Afghan Girl, of a girl with piercing green eyes, has appeared on the cover of National Geographic several times. McCurry has photographed many assignments for National Geographic and has been a member of Magnum Photos since 1986.

McCurry is the recipient of numerous awards, including Magazine Photographer of the Year, awarded by the National Press Photographers Association; the Royal Photographic Society's Centenary Medal; and two first-place prizes in the World Press Photo contest (1985 and 1992).

Life and work
McCurry was born in Philadelphia, Pennsylvania, and attended Penn State University. He originally planned to study cinematography and filmmaking, but instead gained a degree in theater arts and graduated in 1974. He became interested in photography when he started taking pictures for the Penn State newspaper The Daily Collegian.

After a year working in India, McCurry traveled to northern Pakistan where he met two Afghans who told him about the war across the border in Afghanistan.

McCurry's career was launched when, disguised in Afghani garb, he crossed the Pakistan border into rebel-controlled areas of Afghanistan just before the Soviet invasion. "As soon as I crossed the border, I came across about 40 houses and a few schools that were just bombed out," he says. He left with rolls of film sewn into his turban and stuffed in his socks and underwear. These images were subsequently published by The New York Times, Time and Paris Match and won him the Robert Capa Gold Medal for Best Photographic Reporting from Abroad.

McCurry covered more armed conflicts like the Iran–Iraq War, Lebanon Civil War, the Cambodian Civil War, the Islamic insurgency in the Philippines, the Gulf War and the Afghan Civil War. McCurry came close to losing his life twice. He was almost drowned in India, and he survived an airplane crash in Yugoslavia. McCurry has had his work featured in magazines worldwide and he is a frequent contributor to National Geographic.

McCurry concentrates on the toll war takes on humans. He intends to show what war does to not only the landscape, but to the people who inhabit that land. "Most of my images are grounded in people. I look for the unguarded moment, the essential soul peeking out, experience etched on a person’s face. I try to convey what it is like to be that person, a person caught in a broader landscape, that you could call the human condition." What McCurry wants his viewers to take away from his photographs is the "human connection between all of us." He believes there is always some common thing between all humans despite the differences in religion, language, ethnicity, etc. McCurry also states, "I have found that I get completely consumed by the importance of the story I am telling, the feeling that the world has got to know. It's never about the adrenaline. It's about the story." However, sometimes McCurry has witnessed some "horrific" and "distressing" sights. In times like these, he uses his camera as a "shield" because it's easier to witness these events through a viewfinder.

On September 10, 2001, McCurry had just gotten back from Tibet. The morning of September 11, McCurry received a call saying the World Trade Center was on fire. He went up to the roof of his building and started taking photographs, unaware that it was a plane that had hit the towers. McCurry was on the roof when both of the towers fell, "they were just gone. It didn’t seem possible. Like you’re seeing something but you don’t really believe what you’re seeing." After the fall of the towers, McCurry ran to Ground Zero with his assistant. He describes the scene, "there was this very fine white powder everywhere and all this office paper, but there was no recognizable office equipment—no filing cabinets, telephones, computers. It seemed like the whole thing had been pulverized." McCurry left later that night and went back early on September 12, he didn't have any press credentials and had to sneak past security. He was eventually caught and escorted off Ground Zero; he did not go back again.

McCurry is portrayed in a TV documentary The Face of the Human Condition (2003) by Denis Delestrac.

McCurry switched from shooting color slide film to digital capture in 2005 for the convenience of editing in the field and transmitting images to photo editors. He said that he had no nostalgia about working in film in an interview with The Guardian. "Perhaps old habits are hard to break, but my experience is that the majority of my colleagues, regardless of age, have switched over... The quality has never been better. You can work in extremely low light situations, for example."

McCurry shoots in both film and digital, but says he prefers shooting with transparency film. Eastman Kodak gifted him the last roll of Kodachrome film to ever be produced by Kodak. McCurry shot the roll, which was processed in July 2010 by Dwayne's Photo in Parsons, Kansas. Most of these photos were published on the Internet by Vanity Fair. McCurry states, "I shot it for 30 years and I have several hundred thousand pictures on Kodachrome in my archive. I'm trying to shoot 36 pictures that act as some kind of wrap up – to mark the passing of Kodachrome. It was a wonderful film."

In 2015, he was hired by Microsoft to take photographs in areas of New Zealand, which were used as wallpapers in Windows 10.

In 2019, his book Steve McCurry. Animals was published by Taschen and is a compilation of his favorite photographs of animals.

Afghan Girl
McCurry took Afghan Girl in December 1984. It portrays an approximately 12-year-old Pashtun orphan in the Nasir Bagh refugee camp near Peshawar, Pakistan. McCurry found the girl when he heard "unexpected laughter" coming from children inside a one-room school tent for girls. "I noticed this one little girl with these incredible eyes, and I instantly knew that this was really the only picture I wanted to take," he says. This was the first time the girl had ever been photographed. The image was named as "the most recognized photograph" in the history of the National Geographic magazine, and was used as the cover photograph on the June 1985 issue. The photo has also been widely used on Amnesty International brochures, posters, and calendars. The identity of the "Afghan Girl" remained unknown for over 17 years until McCurry and a National Geographic team located the woman, Sharbat Gula, in 2002. McCurry said, "Her skin is weathered; there are wrinkles now, but she is as striking as she was all those years ago."

Afghan Girl controversy
In 2019, a vlogger and professional photographer by the name of Tony Northrup released a research documentary accusing McCurry of obtaining the photograph under false pretenses, and endangering Gula's wellbeing in doing so. McCurry's publicity team responded by accusing Northrup of slander, and the clip was removed. Shortly thereafter, however, it was re-uploaded with a number of corrections, with an accompanying document that detailed a number of sources Northrup had obtained. Sharbat Gula herself had also previously provided some commentary on the photograph, published by BBC News in 2017.

Photo manipulation
In 2016 McCurry was accused of extensively manipulating his images with Photoshop and by other means, removing individuals and other elements.

In a May 2016 interview with PetaPixel, McCurry did not specifically deny making major changes, indicating that he now defines his work as "visual storytelling" and as "art". However, he subsequently added that others print and ship his images while he is travelling, implying that they were responsible for the significant manipulation. "That is what happened in this case. It goes without saying that what happened with this image was a mistake for which I have to take responsibility," he concluded.

When discussing the issue with a writer for Times Lightbox website, McCurry provided similar comments about being a "visual storyteller", though without suggesting that the manipulation was done by others without his knowledge. In fact, the Time writer made the following statement, "Faced with mounting evidence of his own manipulations, McCurry has been forced to address his position in photography." In neither interview did he discuss when the heavy photo manipulation began, or which images have been manipulated. However, considering the controversy it has created, he said that "going forward, I am committed to only using the program in a minimal way, even for my own work taken on personal trips." McCurry also offered the following conclusion to Time Lightbox, "Reflecting on the situation... even though I felt that I could do what I wanted to my own pictures in an aesthetic and compositional sense, I now understand how confusing it must be for people who think I'm still a photojournalist."

McCurry, NYC, 911
In 2016 French comic writer Jean-David Morvan and South Korean artist Kim Jung Gi published a biographical graphic novel about Steve McCurry, titled McCurry, NYC, 911.

McCurry: The Pursuit of Color
In 2021, the documentary biopic entitled McCurry: The Pursuit of Color, directed by Denis Delestrac, produced by Intrepido Films and Polar Star Films and distributed by Dogwoof and Karma Films, was officially selected at the Doc NYC film festival (USA), Festival de Malaga (Spain), and Glasgow Film Festival (Scotland) amongst others. The Spanish cinema release was in June 2022.

Awards 
 1987 – Medal of Honor for coverage of the 1986 Philippine Revolution, Philippines, White House News Photographers Association
 1992 – First Place Nature and Environment Oil-Stricken Bird, Kuwait First Place, General News Stories: Kuwait after the Storm Children's Award: "Camels Under a Blackened SKy", World Press Photo Competition
 1992 – Magazine Feature Picture Award of Excellence: Fiery Aliens First Place, Magazine Science Award: Camels Under A Blackended Sky First Place, Gulf News Sky: Kuwait After the Storm, Picture of the Year Competition
 1992 – Oliver Pebbot Memorial Award: Best Photographic Reporting from Abroad on Golf War Coverage, Overseas Press Club
 1993 – Award of Excellence for Rubble of War, National Press Photographers
 1994 – Arts and Architecture Distinguished Alumni Award, Pennsylvania State University
 1998 – Award of Excellence, Portraits: Red Boy, Picture of the Year Competition
 2002 – Award of Excellence for "Women of Afghanistan"
 2002 – Photographer of the Year
 2003 – C-recipient of the New York Film Festival God for documentary, Afghan Girl Found
 2003 – The Lucie Award for Photojournalism
 2005 – Photojournalism Division – International Understanding through Photography award, Photographic Society of America
 2006 – First Place, Buddha Rising, National Geographic, National Press Photographers Associate
 2011 – Leica Hall of Fame Award
 2014 – Photography of Appreciation Award
 2018 – Golden Doves for Peace journalistic prize issued by the Italian Research Institute Archivio Disarmo
 2019 – Induction into the International Photography Hall of Fame and Museum

Exhibitions
2015–2016 – Steve McCurry: India, Rubin Museum of Art, New York
2015–2016 – Steve McCurry –  Icons and Women, Musei di San Domenico, Forlì, Italy
 2016 – Steve McCurry: The Iconic Photographs, Sundaram Tagore Gallery, Hong Kong
 2016 – The World Through His Lens: Steve McCurry Photographs, New York, United States
 2017 – The World of Steve McCurry, Brussels, Belgium
 2018 –  Steve McCurry Icons, Pavia, Italy
 2018 – 'S Wanderful-Making Pictures – Steve McCurry Solo Exhibition, Taipei, Taiwan
 2019 –  "Le Monde de Steve McCurry", La Sucrière, Lyon, France
2019 – "Steve's House : permanent exhibition", Kashan, Iran
 2019 – "Food", Musei di San Domenico, Forlì, Italy

Publications

References

External links

 
One on One With the Masters of Photography – Interview with McCurry which discuss the techniques of his portrait photography
 McCurry's gallery at photographic agency Sud Est57
 2013 Pirelli Calendar shot by McCurry
 Capturing the Face of Asia – Interview with McCurry by European culture and arts online magazine Culturekiosque (2007)
 UnfoldingMaps.com – Interview with McCurry by podcast Unfolding Maps (2020)
 I Visualize Photo Possibilities Wherever I Am – Interview with McCurry by Indian photography web site "Fotoflock.com" (2009)
  – Al Jazeera interview by Riz Khan
 "It's All Mixed: An Interview with Steve McCurry", GUP Magazine (2013)

Living people
Magnum photographers
American photojournalists
Photography in Afghanistan
Penn State College of Arts and Architecture alumni
Artists from Philadelphia
1950 births
National Geographic photographers